The city of Sherbrooke, Quebec is divided into six boroughs (in French, arrondissements), each with a president and council.

Powers 
The borough council is responsible for: 
Fire prevention
Removal of household waste and residual materials
Funding of community
Social and local economic development agencies
Planning and management of parks and recreational
Cultural and sports facilities, organization of recreational sports and sociocultural activities
Maintaining local roads
Issuing permits
Public consultations for amendments to city planning bylaws
Public consultations and dissemination of information to the public
Land use planning and borough development.

List of Sherbrooke boroughs

See also
 Municipal reorganization in Quebec

External links
 Map showing boroughs
 Information about boroughs (city of Sherbrooke website)